
Xenos may refer to:

 Xenos (Greek), a Greek word meaning "stranger" or "alien"
 Xenos (insect), a genus of insects in the order Strepsiptera
 Xenos (graphics chip), a custom graphics processing unit (GPU) designed by ATI, used in the Xbox 360 video game console

Entertainment
 Xenos (band), an Australian Romani music ensemble
 Xenos, term for extraterrestrial alien species or races in the setting of the Warhammer 40,000 wargame and related spin-offs
 Xenos, a book in the Eisenhorn trilogy by Dan Abnett set in the Warhammer 40,000 universe
 Xenos, a TRS-80 game
Xenos, the name of the intelligent monsters in Is It Wrong to Try to Pick Up Girls in a Dungeon? (season 3)
 "XENOS", a 2016 song by Blank Banshee from MEGA

Other
 Xenos (store), a chain of goods stores in Germany and The Netherlands, owned by Blokker Holding
 , a program created by the German Federal Government
 Xenos Christian Fellowship, a non-denominational church in Columbus, Ohio
 Spiros Xenos (1881–1963), Greek-born Swedish artist
 Sonex Aircraft Xenos, a motorglider
 Xenos Group, a division of Actuate Corporation - now OpenText
 PGFG Xenos, a La Combattante IIIb class FACM ship of the Hellenic Navy

See also
 Xen, a virtual machine monitor software
 Zenos, a prophet mentioned in the Book of Mormon
 Xeno (disambiguation)
 Zeno (disambiguation)
 Xenon (disambiguation)